Sergei "Seryoga" Sergeevich Naidin (born 11 July 2001 in Barnaul, Altai Krai, Russia) is a Russian artistic gymnast. He is the 2016 European Junior Pommel horse champion. On the national level, he is a two-time the 2016, 2018 Russian Junior National All-around champion.

Competitive history

Career

Junior
Naidin began gymnastics in 2006 in Barnaul. In 2014, he competed at the Russian Youth Games where he came in 1st in the all-around. At the "Hope of Russia" competition, he won the all-around, as well as finishing 1st on floor, rings, pommel horse, parallel bars, horizontal bar and 2nd in vault. In 2015, Naidin competed at the international junior gymnastics competition, the Yokohama Cup in Japan finishing 4th in horizontal bar and 5th on floor.

In 2016, Naidin won the 2016 Russian Junior National all-around title, he also took first place in floor, rings and pommel horse. On May 25–29, he competed at the 2016 European Junior Championships where Russia won silver in the team event. Naidin also finished 8th in the individual all-around final. He qualified in one apparatus final, where he won gold in pommel horse.

In 2017, after almost taking a one-year break in competitions related to an injury. Naidin returned to a national competition in June, at the Russian Youth Student Games "2017 Summer Spartakiada". On July 23–30, he competed at the 2017 European Youth Olympic Festival in Győr, Hungary where team Russia won gold (together with Yuri Busse and Aleksandr Kartsev). He finished 6th in the all-around and qualified to three apparatus finals, winning two gold medals in parallel bars and pommel horse, and bronze in rings. In September, Naidin competed at the Junior Japan International, finishing 12th in the all-around.

In 2018, Naidin competed for the qualifying competition in artistic gymnastics for the 2018 Summer Youth Olympics held in Baku, Azerbaijan, where he took silver in the all-around behind teammate Yuri Busse. On July 4–7, at the 2018 Russian Junior National Championships, Naidin defended his title and won the all-around gold ahead of Busse, in the event finals: he won gold medals in floor, pommel horse, parallel bars, silver in high bar and finished 7th in rings. He has received the title of Master of Sport of International Class in the Russian Federation.

At the 2018 Summer Youth Olympic Games he won the all-around silver medal behind Takeru Kitazono. After the all-around competition, his coach did not register him for the apparatus finals by mistake. The International Olympic Committee accepted his appeal and registered him as a ninth gymnast to compete in the apparatus finals. There he won a silver medal on pommel horse and bronze medals on floor and parallel bars. He could not compete in the horizontal bar final due to a back injury.

Naidin's favorite apparatus are the pommel horse, parallel bars and horizontal bar.

References

External links

 
 Sergei Naidin profile 
 GymnasticsResults.com
 

Russian male artistic gymnasts
2001 births
Living people
Sportspeople from Barnaul
Gymnasts at the 2018 Summer Youth Olympics
21st-century Russian people